Monsignor Richard Liddy (born 1938) is a Catholic priest, professor and director of the Center for Catholic Studies at Seton Hall University. He is also the director of the Bernard J. Lonergan Institute and editor of The Lonergan Review, which promote the philosophical teachings of Bernard J. Lonergan. He has authored the books Startling Strangeness: Reading Lonergan's Insight, Transforming Light: Intellectual Conversion in the Early Longergan, and In God's Gentle Arms.

References

External links

See also 

 Seton Hall University
 Bernard J. Lonergan
 The Lonergan Review

Living people
20th-century American Roman Catholic priests
Seton Hall University faculty
1938 births
21st-century American Roman Catholic priests